This article lists the confirmed squads for the 2022 Women's Hockey World Cup tournament held in Terrassa, Spain and Amstelveen, the Netherlands from 1 to 17 July 2022.

Age, club, caps and goals as of 1 July 2022.

Pool A

Chile
The squad was announced on 13 June 2022.

Head coach:  Sergio Vigil

Germany
The squad was announced on 13 June 2022.

Head coach: Valentin Altenburg

Ireland
The squad was announced on 17 June 2022.

Head coach:  Sean Dancer

Netherlands
The squad was announced on 7 June 2022.

Head coach:  Jamilon Mülders

Pool B

China
Head coach:  Alyson Annan

England
The squad was announced on 14 June 2022.

Head coach:  David Ralph

India
The squad was announced on 21 June 2022.

Head coach:  Janneke Schopman

New Zealand
The squad was announced on 22 May 2022.

Head coach: Darren Smith

Pool C

Argentina
The squad was announced on 31 May 2022.

Head coach: Fernando Ferrara

Canada
The squad was announced on 7 June 2022.

Head coach: Rob Short

South Korea
Head coach: Han Jin-su

Spain
The squad was announced on 13 June 2022.

Head coach:  Adrian Lock

Pool D

Australia
The squad was announced on 26 May 2022. Brooke Peris and Meg Pearce were ruled out prior to the tournament due to injury and were replaced by Greta Hayes and Renee Taylor.

Head coach: Katrina Powell

Belgium
The squad was announced on 15 June 2022.

Head coach:

Japan
The squad was announced on 7 June 2022.

Head coach:  Jude Menezes

South Africa
The squad was announced on 10 May 2022.

Head coach: Giles Bonnet

References

squads
Women's Hockey World Cup squads